Sultan Qaboos Street (aka Sultan Qaboos Highway) is a major highway in Muscat, the capital of Oman. It is named after Qaboos bin Said.

The following are close to Sultan Qaboos Street:

 Madinat Al Sultan Qaboos
 Muscat International Airport
 Oman Children's Museum
 Royal Opera House Muscat

See also
 Muscat Expressway
 Transport in Oman

References

Roads in Muscat, Oman